Albert Grisar (25 December 1808 – 15 June 1869) was a Belgian composer, mainly active in Paris.

Career
Born in Antwerp, Grisar's family had intended for him to pursue a tradesman's career, but he defied their wishes to devote himself to music. He studied in Antwerp with Joseph Janssens, in Paris under Anton Reicha, and in the mid-1840s in Naples with Saverio Mercadante. Grisar was a successful comic opera composer, first winning success in Brussels in 1833 and in Paris later in the decade. He collaborated with Flotow on L'Eau merveilleuse (1839), with Flotow and Auguste Pilati in Le Naufrage de la Méduse (1839), and with François-Adrien Boieldieu on L'Opéra à la cour (1840). When he received a grant from the Belgian government in 1840 to study music of Belgian composers in Italy, he instead used his time in Rome and Naples to study compositional techniques of the comic opera. His Parisian works of the late 1840s and early 1850s were particularly well received by audiences.

He died in Asnières near Paris.

Honours
 Knight of the Order of Leopold.

Operas
 Le Mariage impossible, premiere: Théâtre de la Monnaie, Brussels 1833
 Sarah, ou L'Orpheline de Glencoé, premiere: Opéra-Comique, Paris 1836
 L'An mil, premiere: Opéra-Comique, Paris 1837
 Lady Melvil / Le Joallier de Saint-James, premiere: Théâtre de la Renaissance, Paris 1838
 La Suisse à Trianon, Paris 1838
 L'Eau merveilleuse, premiere: Théâtre de la Renaissance, Paris 1839
 Le Naufrage de la Méduse, premiere: Théâtre de la Renaissance, Paris, 31 May 1839
 Les Travestissements, Paris 1839
 Gille ravisseur, premiere: Opéra-Comique, Paris 1848
 Les Porcherons, premiere: Opéra-Comique, Paris 1850
 Bonsoir, monsieur Pantalon, premiere: Opéra-Comique, Paris 1851
 Le Carillonneur de Bruges, premiere: Opéra-Comique, Paris 1852
 Les Amours du diable (libretto by Jules-Henri Vernoy de Saint-Georges), premiere: Théâtre Lyrique, Paris 1853
 Le Chien du jardinier, premiere: Opéra-Comique, Paris 1855
 Voyage autour de ma chambre, Paris 1859
 La Chatte merveilleuse (libretto by Philippe Dumanoir and Adolphe d'Ennery), premiere: Théâtre Lyrique, Paris 1862
 Les Bégaiements d'amour, Paris 1864
 Les Douze Innocentes, Paris 1865
 Le Procès, 1867

References
 Fétis, F.-J.: Biographie universelle des musiciens, supplement published under the direction of Arthur Pougin, vol. 1, pp. 423–424 (Paris: Didot, 1878).
 Mercier, Philippe: "Grisar, Albert", in The New Grove Dictionary of Opera, edited by Stanley Sadie (London: Macmillan, 1992), .
 Pougin, Arthur: Albert Grisar: Étude artistique'' (Paris: Librairie de L. Hachette, 1870), View at Google Books.

References

External links
 

1808 births
1869 deaths
19th-century classical composers
19th-century Belgian male musicians
Belgian classical composers
Belgian male classical composers
Belgian opera composers
Burials at Père Lachaise Cemetery
Male opera composers
Musicians from Antwerp
Pupils of Anton Reicha
Romantic composers